Be Glad for the Song Has No Ending is the eighth album by the Scottish psychedelic folk group, the Incredible String Band, featuring Mike Heron, Robin Williamson, Licorice McKechnie and Rose Simpson. It is the  soundtrack for a film of the same name, and was released on Island Records in March 1971, failing to chart in either the UK or US. It would be the first album from the band on the Island label, and the last to feature Joe Boyd as the producer.

Background

Recording
Recording of the album and soundtrack came during a transitional period for the band. Tracks were completed during Wee Tam and the Big Huge and I Looked Up sessions. As a result, the girlfriends Licorice McKechnie and Rose Simpson are more involved in some tracks in comparison to others. Even the compositions themselves reflect differentiation from the dream-like folk pieces to the less experimental contemporary ones that are more similar to Liquid Acrobat as Regards the Air. The whole B-side of the album is instrumentals that were the soundtrack of the documentary. They appear in the film to set mood to significant scenes. Three additional tracks were added from the Wee Tam sessions that did not make it to the album to have a completed LP. Joe Boyd stated the whole development was "a kind of clear out the cupboard thing".

The documentary 

The documentary film was released in July 1970 and was based on the members of The Incredible String Band. The film is broken down into two parts. Part one featured stage performances and interviews of the band with the intent of learning about the group's thought process and way of living. Part two involves the group with friends dressing up to create a short, 20-minute drama play called The Pirate and The Crystal Ball.

Filming began as early as a March 1968 Royal Festival Hall concert, and was budgeted by Ominibus for what they expected to be a straightforward documentary. Since there were limited camera angles, the concert was broken down into brief clips of pre-selected segments. After concert segments of material including "Mercy I Cry City" and "A Very Cellular Song", brief questioning is taken up by reporters. To one particular question regarding the meaning of their music, Heron responds, "If I could describe my songs I wouldn't sing them". Then, extensive interviews are conducted at the group's communal home in Glasgow along with clips of their daily lives. The film finishes with the fable drama designed by the band, which was completed in one weekend. A basic story line includes a pirate attempting to steal a crystal ball from three fates (Simpson, McKechnie, and Schofield). The fates enlist a hunter (Maistre) to set matters right, and the hunter captures the pirate to be judged by two Gods (Williamson and Heron). In the end, the pirate is forced into an endless reincarnation cycle. A collage of psychedelic images relating to the pirate's past begins and ends with the sound of a baby's cry, concluding the fable.

Track listing
Side one

Side two

Personnel
 Robin Williamson - bass, claves, fiddle, finger cymbals, gimbri, guitar, keyboard, mandolin, piano, sarangui, shakers, violin, vocals
 Mike Heron - bass, chimes, glockenspiel, guitar, harp, horn, keyboard, organ, sitar, vocals
 Licorice McKechnie - backing vocals, keyboard, violin
 Rose Simpson - backing vocals, bass, percussion

References

The Incredible String Band albums
Albums produced by Joe Boyd
1970 soundtrack albums
Film soundtracks
Island Records soundtracks